The Bamberg Magical Dynasty were a Dutch family of magicians, consisting of six generations of Bambergs. The Bambergs were an upper middle-class unorthodox Jewish family. The oldest sons were also magicians and carried on the tradition. This tradition was not always exclusive to just the oldest son; Theo Bamberg's two younger brothers also carried on the family tradition. Three Bambergs were court magicians entertaining the royal family. This chain was unbroken for 165 years, from the 18th to the 20th centuries.

The Bambergs were not only expert magicians, but also trained actors.

Jasper Bamberg 
The first of the Bamberg clan was Jasper Bamberg (1698–1780), who was not a magician but an alchemist and necromancer. He is referred to in a book titled Vader Simon Witgeest. Jasper lived in the early part of the 18th century. He dabbled in chemistry, trying to change base metals into gold. As a necromancer, he tried to revive the dead. His methods were those of the illusionists, using smoke and mirrors. He used hidden magic lanterns that threw pictures on a smoke screen in a darkly lit room. Jasper projected the light off of a revolving mirror on a spindle giving those attending an eerie feeling.

It was written that he attended a dissertation on Cagliostro's theories of the philosopher's stone. The philosopher's stone was a well-known alchemist's tool, believed to help the alchemist turn base metals into gold.

Eliaser Bamberg 

Eliaser Bamberg (1760–1833) was the first of the clan to become a professional magician. He was the oldest (possibly adopted) son of Jasper. He was born in 1760 in Leyden, Holland.

Following the French Revolution, on February 1, 1793, France declared war against Holland, England, and Spain. Eliaser was thirty-three years old at that time and was drafted into the navy as a gunner for a Dutch man-of-war. Due to the explosion of a powder keg, one of his legs was badly injured and had to be amputated, following which he was discharged from duty.

Eliaser started to make use of a hollowed-out wooden leg to make objects disappear. Eventually, his dexterity with this trick earned him the nickname Le Diable boiteux (French for "the lame devil" or "the crippled devil"). As was the custom of the time, Eliaser performed the cups and balls, in the streets of his home town of Leyden as well as taverns, and public squares. He also performed at the homes of wealthy patrons. Soon his fame for doing pure sleight of hand spread all over Holland. Beyond cups and balls, he was also proficient with cards and coin tricks. One of the tricks he was known for was the appearance and disappearance of live frogs and fish in a glass bowl of water.

He didn't limit himself to just sleight of hand, though, he also used a large collection of automates, some of which were created by Oprè. One of these figures was passed down to Robert-Houdin who used it in his show. Another one, the vaulted figure was passed through generations of Bambergs. The last time the figure was mentioned was when Theo Bamberg remembered playing with it as a child.

Eliaser's fellow magicians at the time were Joseph Pinetti, Gustavus Katterfelto, Count Cagliostro, Philippe, and many other noted magicians of the 18th century. Eliaser Bamberg died in 1833 at the age of 73.

David Leendert Bamberg 

Eliaser had one son, David Leendert Bamberg (23 May 1787 – 29 January 1869), who had assisted his father when he was nine years old. When he was a young man, he invented the color changing clay pipe trick. David was considered a worthy successor to his famous father.

David was a skilled magician and did all the tricks of his time. At that time, the Egg Bag was becoming popular with magicians: A large woolen bag was shown and about fifteen eggs was slowly produced from it. Then a live hen was pulled from the bag (Modern versions used a small felt or crepe satin bag and produces and vanishes just one egg). David was the first in the Bamberg family to add the trick to his repertoire using his own method to produce the eggs and hen.

He was initiated into Freemasonry at Arnhem in 1812 and soon rose high in their ranks. In 1843, he became court mechanician (court magician) to William II of the Netherlands and was a favorite of his brother Prince Fredric. Prince Frederick was a great friend to David.

David had four sons; two were actors, the other two were magicians. Edward was one of the greatest actors in the Netherlands and continued to perform up until his death at the age of 84.

On January 29, 1869, David Leendert Bamberg died in Amsterdam at the age of 83.

Tobias Bamberg 
The tradition was passed to David's oldest son Tobias Bamberg (1812–1870). Just like his father and grandfather, Tobias spoke French, German, English, and Dutch in his shows. Tobias was also a highly educated scholar.

He had a very quick wit which he used with his sleight of hand. He used both in a trick called the Boomerang Coins. He counted about twenty coins onto a tray and the coins were poured in the spectator's hands. Five of the coins were given back to Tobias, who vanished them. The coins returned to the hand of the spectator.

Tobias and his son David Tobias also performed for William II. Tobias also received the honor as court mechanician. His father had died in 1869 and fifteen months later, on April 20, 1870, Tobias also died. He was 58.

David Tobias (Papa) Bamberg 
Tobias only had one son, David Tobias Bamberg (1843–1914), known as Papa Bamberg. David had six sons. Three of them were magicians: Tobias (or Theo), Emile, and Edward. David almost ended the tradition of the eldest son becoming a magician. He was an actor, mimic, and public speaker. After watching a performance of famed magician Compars Herrmann, he changed his mind. Herrmann discarded the trappings of the stage magician, preferring to use pure sleight of hand and refine misdirection. David thought that no other magician topped his skill.

He continued the family business at the age of 23. In 1866 he gave his first performance as a magician in Rotterdam. From there he toured Java, Sumatra, Ceylon, and other countries. He then went back to his homeland of Holland. In 1870, David gave a command performance at the Royal Palace. David, like his grandfather and father, was named court mechanician in 1870. This appointment gave him official welcoming to the highest society of Holland. Because of this honor, he was entitled to have the coat-of-arms of the Imperial Court of Holland over his door. The bronze plaque read Academie voor Magische Kunst ("Academy of Magical Art"). Five years later, his eldest son was born.

David and his eldest son Tobias received a royal appointment as William III's magician. David's second command read as such, "His Majesty the King commands me to invite Mr. David Tob Bamberg, court performer, to appear before the Royal Family consisting of the King, William III, her Majesty the Queen, Emma, and her Royal Highness Princess Wilhelmina, for which you will be paid the sum of one hundred florins in full. Performance must not exceed one hour." In 1886, he gave two more royal performances once again assisted by his son Tobias.

In 1907, Papa Bamberg went on tour with son, already famous as Okito. They toured such places as Batavia, Java, Sumatra, Borneo, Guinea, and Ceylon. A week before they were to leave for Paris, Papa Bamberg convinced Theo (Tobias) to go to London to see John Nevil Maskelyne's levitation illusion known as, Entranced Fakir. They went to Egyptian Hall which was known as England’s Home of Mystery for the Saturday evening performance.

Maskelyne's partner Cooke was placed on a sarcophagus and floated up in the air with no support. When Maskelyne walked away from his floating partner, Papa Bamberg and Okito were stunned. Maskelyne passed a hoop over him and brought it to the audience for examination. Then he was brought back down and brought out of his trance. Papa Bamberg was speechless. After leaving the theatre, Papa Bamberg expressed disbelief to his son, saying that he could not understand how the illusion had been carried out.

Years later when Theo worked with Thurston and found out how the secret worked, he wrote his father sharing it with him. That was a year before he died in 1914.

Theo (Okito) Bamberg 

Tobias (Theo) Bamberg (1875–1963) appeared with his father at the palace for Princess Wilhelmina's birthday when he was eleven years old. His father introduced him and Tobias did a few tricks which impressed the King. With his father's aide, Tobias was known as the  Smallest conjurer of the world until he was about 17.
 
He later changed his name to Okito, an anagram of Tokio (which was the spelling of Tokyo at the time). He found that the robes of China were easier to hide the bowls he produced than the Japanese kimono he previously wore. Already known as Okito, he kept the name, so he was forever known as a Chinese magician with a Japanese name.

Tobias subsequently changed his first name to Theodore, at the request of his English wife Lily, who disliked the name Toby as a nickname for dogs.

Theo traveled the world as Okito and performed many fine effects like his improved production of a bowl of water, the floating ball, Okito box, and the Sofa trick to name a few. He retired in Chicago and made magic props for Joe Berg the magic dealer. He died in 1963.

David (Fu Manchu) Bamberg 

Theo had three children. His oldest was David Tobias Bamberg (1904 - 1974), who was known as Fu Manchu and toured the world with his own illusion show.

David made his first appearance aged four in Russia, as a little boy dressed up in Chinese clothes, whose father Okito produced him from a cloth. While David was still young, he joined the famous telepathist Julius Zancig, and worked as his partner after Zancig's wife Agnes died. He was with Zancig for a number of years playing the blindfolded medium. He completed his education in the United States and went to England to continue his studies, but instead began training to be a professional magician.

In 1921, he returned to the US and appeared in various magical acts, before finding success in Europe. He presented his original comedy shadowgraph act in Vienna, subsequently touring all of Europe. Theo and David also worked together for a time.
David later worked with the Great Raymond as an assistant. With the backing of a friend, David created his own show and toured the world as Fu Manchu.

David had one son, Robert, who never became a professional magician, thus ending the magical dynasty of the Bambergs.

References

Further reading
The Oriental Magic of the Bambergs, by Robert J. Albo
 Illusion Builder to Fu-Manchu (David Bamberg of South America, Magician), TRIBUTE to Edmund Spreer by Robert E. Olson
Illusion Show by David Bamberg
 Tarbell Course in Magic Volume 5: Lesson 68 Magic of the Bambergs by Harlan Tarbell

Dutch magicians
Dutch families
Jewish families
Show business families